L'attore scomparso ("The Actor Died") is a 1941 Italian film directed by Luigi Zampa and starring Vivi Gioi. It is a remake of the German film Was wird hier gespielt? (1940) based on the eponymous play by Theo Lingen.

Cast
 Vivi Gioi as L'attrice
 María Mercader as L'attrice ingenua (as Maria Mercader)
 Stefano Sibaldi as L'attore
 Giulio Donadio as Il commissario de polizia
 Carlo Campanini as L'altro attore
 Lauro Gazzolo as L'impresario
 Bianca Della Corte as La figlia
 Maria Jacobini as La madre
 Virgilio Riento as Il trovarobe
 Arturo Bragaglia as Il suggeritore
 Carlo Lombardi as Il "grande" attore
 Manoel Roero as Il regista (as Manuel D'Alzara)

References

External links

1941 films
1940s Italian-language films
Italian black-and-white films
Films directed by Luigi Zampa
Italian remakes of foreign films
Remakes of German films
1940s Italian films